The Minister for Better Regulation and Innovation, previously the Minister for Innovation and Better Regulation was a minister in the New South Wales Government, who was responsible for the regulation of occupations and professions in relation to architects, building and construction, licensed conveyancers, motor dealers and repairers, pawn brokers, property stock and business agents and tow trucks. The minister was also responsible for the administration of the Betting and Racing Act 1998 and greyhound racing.

History
The portfolio was established in the second Baird ministry, with the regulation of occupations and professions previously the responsibility of the Minister for Fair Trading. The portfolio was abolished in the second Perrottet ministry with the regulation of occupations and professions becoming the responsibility of the Minister for Fair Trading while betting and racing became the responsibility of the Minister for Hospitality and Racing.

List of ministers

Former ministerial titles

Regulatory Reform

See also 

List of New South Wales government agencies

References

Better Regulation and Innovation